General elections were held in Guatemala on 11 September 2011 in order to elect the President, Vice President, members of Congress, members of the Central American Parliament and mayors and councillors for all municipalities. The Patriotic Party emerged as the largest party in Congress, winning 56 of the 158 seats.

As no candidate received more than 50% of the vote, a second round of the presidential election was held on 6 November with Otto Pérez Molina of the PP facing Manuel Baldizón of Renewed Democratic Liberty. Pérez was elected with 53.7% of the vote.

Campaign
Guatemalan National Revolutionary Unity and other leftist groups ran under the Broad Front of the Left banner, nominating Rigoberta Menchú as their presidential candidate.

Guatemala's high crime rate was a major issue in the campaign as it sits near the Mexican border that is a conduit for drug trafficking.

Baldizon campaigned on the premise of having Guatemala's football team to the World Cup. He also promised to tackle poverty and crime, as well as assure workers an extra month's salary every year. He also said he would reinstate the death penalty and televise executions.

Opinion polls
Polls showed Pérez Molina with a lead over other possible candidates.

A poll for the second round showed Pérez Molina with 49.4% to Baldizón's 39.2%; 11% were undecided. A second poll gave Pérez Molina 39.7% to Baldizón's 32.2%, with 28% undecided. A third poll gave Pérez Molina the lead with 45.7% to Baldizón's 37.2% and 17.1% undecided. A final poll had Pérez Molina ahead with 54.6%, Baldizón at 38.7% and undecided at 5.7%.

Former Foreign Minister Edgar Gutierrez said that "the polling methods are inadequate. They've failed to capture how between 25 and 30 per cent of the people intend to vote."

Conduct
Amongst the observers for the election were Oscar Almengor, who led a team University of San Carlos.

According to Article 186(c) of the Constitution, the relatives of the President cannot participate in the Presidential election when the relative holds the Presidency. Sandra Torres, former wife of the current president, got divorced to run for the presidency. There were several requests to have a warrant to forbid Sandra Torres from participating in the election. On 9 August 2011, the Constitutional Court upheld a sentence of the Supreme Court preventing Torres from running.

Results

President
On 6 November, Molina declared victory in the election saying that: "For all the Guatemalans who have put their trust in me, I thank you very much. To those Guatemalans who did not vote for Otto Perez, I make a call to unite and to work together in the next four years, leaving aside party colours." Turnout for the runoff was half that of the first round in some regions.

Congress
Of 158 congressmen to be elected, 126 congressmen sought re-election but only 56 were re-elected and 102 new congressmen were elected for the first time since democratic election took root in Guatemala. About 65% of MPs were first time representatives, which was the first time this occurred since the 1995 election.

References

External links
 Tribunal Supremo Electoral 
 Elecciones Generales 2011 
 Resultados Elecciones Generales y al Parlamento Centroamericano 2011 

Elections in Guatemala
Guatemala
General
Presidential elections in Guatemala
Election and referendum articles with incomplete results